Clintons, previously branded as Clinton Cards, is a chain of stores in the UK founded in 1968 by Don Lewin and known for selling greeting cards, together with soft toys and related gift products.

It was listed on the London Stock Exchange and was a constituent of the FTSE Fledgling Index. On 9 May 2012 the company entered administration and following the closure of 350 branches, the company was bought by American Greetings.

The company fell into administration in 2012 and 2019, and was purchased both times by companies owned by the Weiss family.

Clintons is managed by Eddie Shepard, from American Greetings’ subsidiary, Schurman Retail Group.

Starting in July 2012, the company began the gradual introduction of a new store design and logo, which removed the previous ‘Clinton Cards’ branding, replacing it with the new ‘Clintons’ name.

History

Clinton Cards was founded in 1968 when Don Lewin OBE opened his first shop in Epping, Essex. The business grew to 77 shops by 1988 and was then successfully floated on the London Stock Exchange.

In 2004, the company purchased the Birthdays chain of card and party shops for £46.4million, but placed the subsidiary into administration in 2009, subsequently buying back 140 of the 332 stores.

In May 2012, the company's main supplier American Greetings bought £36 million of Clintons debt from its main lending banks, and immediately called in the debt for payment. Clinton Cards was unable to make the payment and entered administration on 9 May, with Peter Saville, Simon Freakley and Anne O’Keefe of Zolfo Cooper LLP, appointed as Joint Administrators of the Company. A week later 350 branches were closed, including all the Birthdays branches, and the remaining 397 stores were purchased in June 2012 by US based American Greetings' subsidiary Lakeshore Lending Limited.

In October 2012, 12 stores were sold to rival Card Factory.

See also
 Me to You Bears

References

External links

American Greetings
Retail companies of the United Kingdom
Retail companies established in 1968
1968 establishments in the United Kingdom
Companies that have entered administration in the United Kingdom